Carlos Mendes Varela (born 28 December 1984) is a Portuguese-born French professional rugby league footballer. Arrived in France at 12, he took the French nationality and played in 2008 for the France A team (reserve of the national team). His position is winger or centre. He is currently playing for Toulouse Olympique in the Co-operative Championship competition in France and England. Prior to his signing with Toulouse he was playing at Lyon in the French first division.

Background
Carlos Mendes Varela was born in Seixal, Portugal.

References

External links
Toulouse Olympique profile
Widnes Vikings: Portuguese star could figure for Toulouse in Co-operative Championship game Runcorn & Widnes Weekly News

1984 births
Living people
People from Seixal
French people of Portuguese descent
French rugby league players
Portuguese rugby league players
Rugby league wingers
Sportspeople from Setúbal District
Toulouse Olympique players